James Bergstrom is an American musician best known as the drummer for the band Second Coming. Before that, he played drums for the band Sleze (later renamed Alice N' Chains), which also featured future Alice in Chains vocalist Layne Staley.

Biography

Sleze and Alice N' Chains

In 1984, Bergstrom co-founded a garage band called Sleze whose jam room was set up in his parents' basement. At the suggestion of his friend Ken Elmer, Bergstrom and his bandmates recruited Elmer's stepbrother Layne Staley, who back then also went by the surname Elmer, as vocalist. They performed live at various high schools, playing Slayer and Armored Saint covers. This band went through several lineup changes before changing their name to Alice N' Chains. The group continued to tour throughout the Seattle area and recorded two demos before they broke up around 1987, which was the year that Bergstrom graduated from Shorewood High. Staley went on to form the band Alice in Chains whose 1990 debut album Facelift lists Bergstrom as one of the people they wished to thank. Nick Pollock, another former member of Sleze/Alice N' Chains, became lead singer of the band My Sister's Machine, which also thanked Bergstrom within the liner notes of their 1992 debut album Diva.

Second Coming

Meanwhile, Bergstrom co-founded the band Second Coming sometime in the early 1990s and was eventually joined by his childhood friend Johnny Bacolas, who had also been a member of Sleze/Alice N' Chains. This band also went through several lineup changes throughout its history with Bergstrom as the sole constant member before breaking up in 2008. Their catalog consists of three studio albums and one acoustic EP, all of which feature both Bergstrom and Bacolas.

In 1994, they independently released their debut album L.O.V.Evil, which features a guest appearance by Layne Staley on the track "It's Coming After". Four years later, they signed on to Capitol Records and released their eponymous second album Second Coming. This album produced two singles titled "Soft" and "Vintage Eyes", the latter of which had a music video. Another track titled "Unknown Rider" was included on the soundtrack for the blockbuster film The Sixth Sense. The band split from Capitol Records in 2001 after the departure of Gary Gersh, the president who signed them to the label. Following the split, they independently released an EP titled Acoustic and third studio album 13.

Second Coming were purportedly working on a fourth album that was due to be released in 2007. However, the band has since broken up. While the other members of Second Coming have continued to record and perform with other acts, Bergstrom has largely focused on family life but he still keeps in touch with his former bandmates.

Discography

References

External links

Alice N' Chains members
Second Coming (band) members
Living people
American rock drummers
Grunge musicians
Musicians from Seattle
Year of birth missing (living people)